Kobilica (Macedonian and Serbian Cyrillic: Кобилица) is a mountain peak in the Šar Mountains. It is 2,528 m high and is located on central part of the main Shara ridge that forms the border between North Macedonia and Kosovo. It can be seen from the Kosovo city of Prizren as well as from Tetovo in North Macedonia.

The peak is known for its sharp pyramidal shape and the rocky ridge Treskavec on it western side. It inspires with its proper shape and awes with its sharp edges. It is sometimes dubbed as Tetovo Materhorn.

Gallery

Notes

Two-thousanders of Kosovo
Two-thousanders of North Macedonia
Šar Mountains